Gobabis State Hospital is a government-run hospital in Gobabis, Omaheke Region, Namibia. It has 150 beds and was completed in 1991.

References

Hospital buildings completed in 1991
Government buildings completed in 1991
Hospitals in Namibia
Gobabis
Hospitals established in 1991
Buildings and structures in Omaheke Region
1991 establishments in Namibia